West Liberty University (WLU) is a public university in West Liberty, West Virginia. It is West Virginia's oldest college or university.  It offers more than 70 undergraduate majors plus graduate programs, including a master's degree in education and an online MBA. WLU's athletic teams, known as the Hilltoppers, are charter members of the NCAA Division II Mountain East Conference with nearly 400 student-athletes participating in 18 intercollegiate sports, including football, basketball, wrestling, track, tennis and baseball.

History
What is now West Liberty University was established as West Liberty Academy on March 30, 1837, 26 years before the state was admitted to the union. Under the guidance of Reverend Nathan Shotwell, it was created to respond to the need for higher educational opportunities west of the Appalachian ridge. The institution was originally a normal school and was named after the town in which it is located. West Liberty was so named in the late 18th century as the westernmost point of the new liberty provided through the U.S. Declaration of Independence.

Under the direction of Paul N. Elbin (at age 30, the youngest president of a four-year college in the U.S.), the West Liberty Academy transitioned to West Liberty State Teachers College and eventually West Liberty State College.  Under Elbin's 35-year leadership, the college developed a full curriculum, faculty, staff, student services, and activities including music and theatre.

West Liberty was approved to become a university by the West Virginia Higher Education Policy Commission in November 2008. The West Liberty Board of Governors voted to change to West Liberty University on May 3, 2009. The bulk of its student body comes from the Northern Panhandle of West Virginia, eastern Ohio, and western Pennsylvania.

After Robin Capehart's tenure as first president of West Liberty University and a short interim presidency by the much-admired John McCullough, Stephen Greiner was selected unanimously on October 29, 2015 as president. Since then, the university has added eight graduate programs and new athletic facilities and has increased enrollment significantly.

Colleges

Gary E. West College of Business
In 1938, West Liberty Teacher's College began offering courses in Business and Commerce – a two-year Secretarial Studies program and a four-year Business education degree. By 1963, the college had established a full Department of Business Administration offering curricula in accounting, management and marketing to 338 business students. It is accredited by the International Assembly for Collegiate Business Education IACBE and offers a Bachelor of Science degree and a Masters of Business Administration (MBA).

College of Arts and Communication
The College is divided into two departments – the Department of Journalism, Communication Studies and Visual Arts and the Department of Music and Theater.

Media Arts Center
The West Liberty University Media Arts Center opened in November 2006. The 5 million dollar facility includes: a recording studio, a television control, engineering core, and studio, where studio newscasts, television shows and special televised events take place. The building is also furnished with an editing classroom, 3D Audio voice-over room, and a multi-purpose classroom.

WLTV-14 (The campus's community television station) airs on Comcast Cable in Hancock, Ohio and Marshall Counties in West Virginia. The school's community television station began in August 2007, but the television program has been on-going since 1990.

College of Liberal Arts
The College of Liberal Arts provides courses that are part of every student's program of study regardless of their major. The college is divided into two administrative units: the Department of Humanities and the Department of Social and Behavioral Sciences. The Department of Humanities includes studies in English Literature, Comics Studies, Rhetoric and Writing, English Education, Foreign Language, and Philosophy.  The Department of Social and Behavioral Sciences includes studies in Criminal Justice, Geography, History, Interdisciplinary Pre-Law, International Studies, Political Science, Social Studies Education, Social Work, Sociology, and Appalachian Studies.

College of Education and Human Performance
The College of Education and Human Performance is divided into two departments: the Department of Professional Education and the Department of Health and Human Performance.

College of Sciences
The College of Sciences at West Liberty is divided into five departments: Physical Sciences and Mathematics (Chemistry, Mathematics, and Physics), Biological Sciences, Health Sciences (Dental Hygiene, Nursing, Medical Laboratory Sciences, and Speech Pathology and Audiology), Psychology, and Physician Assistant Studies.

Dental hygiene
West Liberty University offers one of the few comprehensive dental hygiene programs in the Ohio Valley. It was also one of the first colleges in the nation to offer such a program. The program is accredited by the American Dental Association Commission of Dental Accreditation. The program was opened in September, 1938, and graduated its first class in 1940. Since then, about 2,345 students have graduated from the program. The dental hygiene students have the opportunity to enroll for a professional program ending with an Associate of Science Degree in Dental Hygiene or a professional program ending with a Bachelor of Science in Dental Hygiene. The Dental Hygiene office offers dental cleaning services for any member of the community at affordable rates.

Campbell Hall of Health Sciences
The $20 million, 70,000 sq.ft. Health Sciences Building was dedicated and opened on May 3, 2014. The Dental Hygiene, Medical Laboratory Sciences, Nursing, Physician Assistant Studies Master's Program, Speech Pathology and Audiology, and Chemistry programs are located in the new building.

Clubs and organizations
West Liberty University offers 9 organizations made up of fraternities and sororities, 18 academic and professional organizations, 10 honoraries, 6 sports and recreational clubs, 6 religiously affiliated groups and 23 special interest groups.

Greek life
West Liberty University has nine Greek organizations on campus. The national fraternities and sororities include Phi Delta Theta, Alpha Xi Delta and Chi Omega. The remaining organizations are local sororities and fraternities, including the sororities Delta Theta Kappa, Lambda Psi Sigma and Beta Rho Epsilon. Fraternities on campus are Chi Nu, Kappa Delta Kappa, and Beta Theta Gamma.
Former fraternities and sororities include Delta Chi, Theta Xi, Kappa Delta Rho, Phi Sigma Kappa, Tau Kappa Epsilon, Phi Sigma, Delta Zeta Pi, and Delta Tau Chi.

Athletics

West Liberty University's Intercollegiate Athletics Program is an integral part of the institution's total educational mission. Close to nineteen men's and women's sports are offered: football, women's volleyball, men's and women's tennis, men's and women's cross country, men's and women's basketball, wrestling, women's softball, men's baseball, men's and women's track, men's and women's golf, women's soccer acrobatic and tumbling and in the Fall of 2019 men's soccer. There is also a coed cheerleading squad. The college is a member of NCAA Division II and formerly belonged to the 16-member West Virginia Intercollegiate Athletic Conference (WVIAC). In June 2012, it was one of nine WVIAC members that announced plans to leave the conference after the 2012–13 school year to start a new Division II league. Two months later, the new league was unveiled as the Mountain East Conference, scheduled to begin play in 2013–14 with West Liberty as one of its 12 charter members.

Campus facilities

 Academic, Sports and Recreation Complex (ASRC) – Opened in the summer of 2000, the complex features an exercise physiology suite, a conference center, a wellness/fitness center, team rooms and administrative office area. The multi-purpose arena includes a competition basketball-volleyball court and three additional modules for classes, intramurals, athletic team practices/ events and other functions. The project involved the connection of two buildings, Blatnik and Bartell halls, and the construction of a new  multi-purpose arena. The Blatnik building is now the Blatnik "Wing" and is named for Dr. Albert Blatnik, long-time coach, director of athletics, and chairperson of the Department of Physical Education. This area consists of a gymnasium, classrooms, offices, a four-lane swimming pool and a wrestling practice room. The Bartell "Wing," named for Dr. Joseph Bartell, former dean, athletic director and multi-sport coach, houses four racquetball courts, classrooms, lockers, a training room, an athletic weight room, a wellness center, offices, and connects with the arena.
 Arnett Hall of Natural Sciences – This building was named for Denver F. Arnett, Academic Dean of West Liberty from 1955 to 1970. The complex includes 12 laboratories, six general-purpose classrooms, faculty offices, and houses the biology and chemistry units. A modern greenhouse is located on the south end of the building.
 College Hall- The Helen Pierce Elbin Auditorium seats 450 and serves as a recital hall and center for lectures and other public programs. It is equipped with a 42-rank, three-manual Moeller pipe organ and two concert grand pianos. The building houses voice studios, a music education classroom, and a recording studio.
 College Union – The College Union is designed to serve the social and extracurricular needs of the students, faculty, staff, administration, and guests, providing lounges, a Sodexo food court, a Subway franchise, an ATM, and a campus service center (post office, etc.). The college bookstore, the student newspaper, the campus radio station 91.5 WGLZ West Liberty, and guest rooms for parents are also provided in the Union. Limited student employment is provided in the Union.
 Hall of Fine Arts – This is the administrative center of the Department of the Arts and Communications. The Hall of Fine Arts houses Kelly Theatre, art studios, art gallery, music practice rooms, electronic piano labs, Disklavier piano studios, choral room, band rooms, general classrooms, and faculty offices.
 Interfaith Chapel – This worship center seats 175 and is equipped with a 33-rank, three-manual Moeller pipe organ and a grand piano. Other facilities include five offices and the Ellwood Social Room. West Liberty University is one of only a few state institutions to host an interfaith chapel on its campus.
 Main Hall – This four-story structure, located on the circle just beyond the main entrance, houses several academic sections and also serves as the major classroom area. In addition, the administrative offices of information technology services are centralized here. The building includes the Curtis and McColloch wings, which were the two original academic facilities on campus. These structures were named for pioneer West Liberty families who played important roles in the early development of West Liberty.
 Media Arts Center – This wing of the Hall of Fine Arts opened in Fall 2006, the Media Arts Center is a facility housing a music technology computer lab, digital media design lab, recording studio, television studio, and graphic design lab.
 Paul N. Elbin Library – The three-story building was named in honor of Paul N. Elbin, President of the College from 1935 until 1970. The library collection consists of more than 200,000 print volumes, 800 hard copy periodical and newspaper subscriptions, access to several thousand online periodical subscriptions, electronic databases, and numerous titles in media or microform formats. On the main floor are reference services; reference education classroom; bibliographic instruction; circulation services; and the fiction, videocassette, DVD, music and periodical collections. Photocopy machines for print and microforms are located near the periodical section. Word processing stations and Internet access stations, as well as digital imaging, are located on this floor. The third floor houses most of the open stack circulating collection including the children's literature section. Also found on the third floor are the Special Collections: the Nelle M. Krise Rare Book Room that features a collection of books tracing the history of bookmaking, the college archives, and the college museum. In addition, rooms and areas are available for conferences, seminars, meetings, group and individual study—and most are equipped for the latest technology. The Humanities Department offices, classrooms, computer lab, and major's lounge are located on the lower level of the building.
 West Family Stadium – Named for community leader, businessman and alumnus Gary E. West ('58) and wife Flip West and Family, the West Family Stadium hosts football games and more and includes the Stephen J. Russek Field, a Mondo Echofill Star artificial turf arena with a seating capacity of 4,000. It also includes the Charlie Annett Hospitality Box, named after alumnus and donor Charlie Annett '66. On 30 August 2008, the University held a field dedication prior to the football game to thank Gary ('58) and Flip West for their vision and generosity. WLU vs. Edinboro University marked the first game played on the new turf. The field was officially renamed in the Fall of 2014.
 Shaw Hall – Formerly a women's residence hall named for John Shaw, president from 1908 to 1919. Shaw Hall currently houses the offices of Admissions, Alumni Association, Campus Safety, the president, provost and vice president of academic affairs, registrar, business office, financial aid, human resources, institutional advancement, marketing, public relations, housing administrative offices and student service center. The university's Health Services Center is also located in this building. Shaw Hall has been placed on the National Register of Historic Places.
 Shotwell Hall – Formerly a men's residence hall named for the Reverend Nathan Shotwell, D.D., founder of West Liberty Academy, Shotwell Hall currently houses International Student Office and the Office of Graduate Studies. This building has been placed on the National Register of Historic Places.

Residence life

There are seven residence halls on campus.

There is a physical education club for students majoring in physical education, and an intramural program covering activities such as basketball, volleyball, softball, tennis, swimming, racquetball, volleyball, ping pong, billiards, flag football, aerobics, euchre, and 3-on-3 basketball. This program is operated by the office of the Vice President of Student Affairs.

Alumni

Alumni association
The West Liberty University Alumni Association was founded in June 1877 with 103 members. From its beginning, the growth and development of the Alumni Association has been dedicated to promoting the interests of West Liberty University and strengthening the loyalty of and fostering support among its graduates, former students, and friends. The association serves as the liaison between the alumni of West Liberty University and its administration, staff, faculty, students, and friends. Today, the Alumni Association represents nearly 20,000 alumni and continues to foster a spirit of unity and fellowship through communications, development, publicity, special events, recruiting, and career exploration.

Alumni association "Wall of Honor"
The West Liberty University Alumni Association Board of Directors instituted a project in 1990 to demonstrate to current students, visitors, and friends that the college has some very successful graduates. This project, known as the "Alumni Wall of Honor," is a dramatic way to honor some of the college's most distinguished alumni and display pride in the accomplishments of its graduates. The concept was suggested by then Associate Professor of Physics Robert W. Schramm, who is a 1958 graduate of the college and a 2002 Alumni Wall of Honor inductee. The Alumni Wall of Honor is housed in the south end of the Union known as the Alumni Lounge.

Liberty Oaks Alumni House Bed and Breakfast
First occupied in 1936 and serving as the residence for the Presidents of West Liberty University until 1997, Liberty Oaks Alumni House Bed & Breakfast is a stately mansion located on the West Liberty campus.

Clyde D. Campbell Alumni Park
Alumni Park was home to three black granite pyramids displaying the engraved names of alumni and friends of West Liberty University. Alumni Park was located in the "heart" of the campus – just outside Main Hall and adjacent to the Union, at the edge of the 'quad'. In the summer of 2017, these structures were removed due to deterioration. A replacement wall of alumni and friends is expected to be erected within the breezeway of Main Hall.

Notable alumni
George C. Allen II, Air National Guard Brigadier General
Chris Booker, radio talk-show host
Todd H. Bullard (B.A., 1953), founding member of Chi Nu Fraternity and former president of Potomac State College and Bethany College
Derrick Evans, professional football coach and politician, former West Virginia legislator
Erik Fankhouser, professional bodybuilder, International Federation of BodyBuilding & Fitness (IFBB)
Tim Hicks, professional football player
Mickey Marotti, football coach
Mark Murphy, professional football player
Joe Niekro, professional baseball player
Brad Paisley, country music singer and songwriter; attended two years
 Maria Pappas, Cook County, Illinois Treasurer (1998–present)
Lou Piccone, professional football player
Rick Schneider-Calabash, animation producer, writer, director for Walt Disney Studios
Ray Searage, professional baseball player

References

External links
 
 WLU Athletics website

 
Education in Ohio County, West Virginia
Educational institutions established in 1837
Public universities and colleges in West Virginia
1837 establishments in Virginia